Bent Tomtum (6 February 1949 - 15 October 2001) was a Norwegian ski jumper who competed from 1968 to 1973. He finished fifth in the individual large hill event at the 1968 Winter Olympics in Grenoble.

Tomtum's best career finish was second in an individual normal hill event in West Germany in 1970.

References

1949 births
2001 deaths
Norwegian male ski jumpers
Ski jumpers at the 1968 Winter Olympics
Olympic ski jumpers of Norway
Sportspeople from Gjøvik
20th-century Norwegian people